Ron Rivers (born November 13, 1971, in Elizabeth, New Jersey) is a former professional American football player who played running back for six seasons for the Detroit Lions, Atlanta Falcons, and Pittsburgh Steelers for one year.  Rivers played college football for Fresno State University, where he rushed for 3,473 yards and 28 touchdowns in three seasons, with an average of over 6 yards per carry.  He also caught 56 passes for 558 yards and another touchdown, and returned 19 kickoffs for 357 yards.  Rivers went on to play six seasons in the NFL, recording 1,490 all-purpose yards and 4 touchdowns.

Rivers' son, Ronnie Rivers, also attended Fresno State, where he broke his father's school record for touchdowns (52) and recorded 5,028 all-purpose yards.  After going undrafted in 2022, Ronnie Rivers signed as a free agent with the Arizona Cardinals.

Professional career

References

1971 births
Living people
Sportspeople from Elizabeth, New Jersey
American football running backs
Fresno State Bulldogs football players
Detroit Lions players
Atlanta Falcons players
Players of American football from New Jersey